The Irvine Spectrum Center is an outdoor shopping center developed by the Irvine Company, located in the Irvine Spectrum district on the southeast edge of Irvine, California. The mall features Nordstrom and Target department stores, a ferris wheel, and a Regal Cinemas 21-screen movie theater. Built over a 10-year period, the first phase of the center opened in 1995 and the second phase followed in 1998. The third phase was completed in 2002. The fourth and fifth phases were built and completed between 2005 and 2006. The mall was used for establishing shots of the fictional "Mall of Miami" in the Disney Channel television series Austin and Ally.

History
Planning of the development of the area began in 1985. In 1989, the Irvine Company completed two 15-story office towers at the site. The retail and entertainment portion of the development, then known as the "Entertainment Center at the Irvine Spectrum Center", began construction in 1993. This first phase of the mall opened in 1995 and consisted of Edwards Cinemas' 21-screen multiplex, Oasis Food Court, and GameWorks. The second phase opened in 1998. The mall's carousel was added in 2001. In 2002, the mall's third phase opened, adding a "Giant Wheel" Ferris wheel, and the centers two anchor stores, Robinsons-May and Nordstrom. Robinsons-May was re-branded as Macy's in 2006 after it was bought by Macy's. Another expansion opened in 2006, adding Target as a third anchor. Smaller expansions have been added since, such as the Clock Court restaurants and a children's play area. 2016 saw the completion of 200 Spectrum Center, an office tower on the northwestern edge of the property, designed by Pei Cobb Freed & Partners. At 323 feet tall, 200 Spectrum Center is the tallest building in Orange County. Since 2003, a skating rink has been offered during the winter months, adjacent to the Giant Wheel. Macy's closed its Irvine Spectrum location in 2016.

Regal Cinemas
The Regal Cinemas originally opened as Edwards Cinema 21 and had a 21-screen movie theater that was once the largest movie theater in the western United States. During development, the Edwards company code-named it "The Big One". This remained the movie theater's nickname until other theaters eclipsed its screen count, particularly 30-screen AMC Theatres megaplex at The Outlets at Orange. The theater bore over two miles of pink and purple neon lights. On August 21, 2020, the movie theater reopened as Regal Cinemas with a new modern look.

Expansion
The Irvine Company announced in 2016 that the former Macy's building would be torn down and turned into 20 new stores, which were to open in 2018. The new stores have since opened in the southeastern section of the center, featuring a newly designed Apple Store and 19 new stores and restaurants. 

The Irvine Spectrum Center continued to expand a new wing on the south side of the center in 2020. The outdoor mall added large stores, restaurants, and cafes such as Sephora, Black Dot Cafe, Apple, and a new children's playground. This $200 million expansion has attracted new revenue for the mall.

Design
The architecture of the property is based on Moroccan architecture, figuring most prominently in the center's second phase.

The center is car dependent, with the center itself surrounded by at least 2,300 parking spaces.

A white obelisk, which at night features the word "SPECTRUM" vertically projected onto it, is located on the northern corner near the freeway. It contains a cell phone and television tower.

Attractions 
In 2002, the Irvine Spectrum Center added a Ferris wheel called Giant Wheel. It is made by Westech Limited in Italy. Each open-air gondola can seat up to 6 people with a minimum of 2 people. It is located near Nordstrom. 
 It has a carousel fabricated in San Francisco.

Gallery

References

Buildings and structures in Irvine, California
Postmodern architecture in California
Shopping malls in Orange County, California
Shopping malls established in 1995
Tourist attractions in Irvine, California